The People's Key is the ninth studio album by American band Bright Eyes. The album was recorded in Omaha, Nebraska at ARC Studios, produced by Mike Mogis, and engineered by Mogis and Andy LeMaster. The album was released on February 15, 2011, lead singer Conor Oberst's 31st birthday, by Saddle Creek Records. Prior to its official release, the album was available to stream online in its entirety, as part of NPR's "First Listen" series.

The album features guest artists Andy LeMaster of Now It's Overhead, Matt Maginn of Cursive, Carla Azar of Autolux, Clark Baechle of The Faint, Shane Aspegren of The Berg Sans Nipple, Laura Burhenn of The Mynabirds,  and Denny Brewer of Refried Ice Cream. The lyrics make mention of Haile Selassie, the Lion of Judah and I and I; all things associated with Rastafari.

Packaging
According to designer Zack Nipper, the basic idea for the "wall of fire" design came from Conor Oberst, who wanted it to be "visually striking".  The design was created using cut paper, similar to the cover for Every Day and Every Night, the first Bright Eyes release Nipper had worked on.  Nipper stated that he "designed for vinyl first, then CD, and MP3 last, because that's the order in which viewing it matters."

The first 50,000 copies of this album came with a limited-edition packaging similar to that of all copies of the LP record, in a 6-panel tri-fold die-cut digipak printed on iridescent foil, and including an O-card, full-color CD inner sleeve and a 20-page booklet.

In January 2011, it was announced that The People's Key had won the Best Art Vinyl award.

Critical reception

The People's Key has received mixed to positive critical reception. At Metacritic, which assigns a normalized rating out of 100 to reviews from mainstream critics, the album received an average score of 70, based on 35 reviews, which indicates "generally favorable reviews".

AllMusic praised its smaller scale and gave the album 3 and a 1/2 out of 5 stars. Pitchfork gave the album 5 out of 10 and criticized the "impersonal" feel of the songs, yet praised "Ladder Song". Slant Magazine gave the album 2 out of a possible 5 stars. No Ripcord gave the album a 6 out of 10 and commented, "There's not a lot fundamentally wrong with The People's Key; it's just that we know Bright Eyes can do better." However, Drowned in Sound and NME gave the album 9 out of 10 and 8 out of 10 respectively, with NME calling it a "sleek electro-tinged classic" and praising Oberst's more electric musical direction, saying it brought a "fresh strain of Bright Eyes record".

Commercial performance
The album debuted at number 13 on the Billboard 200, and made it to number 7 on the Alternative Albums chart. The People's Key also reached number 46 on the UK Albums Chart.

Track listing

A limited edition deluxe packaging edition contains mp3 file samples of various Saddle Creek artists.

Personnel
Conor Oberst – vocals, guitars, pianos and keyboards
Mike Mogis – guitars, pedal steel, effects, programming and percussion
Nate Walcott – synthesizers, pianos, organs and Mellotron
Andy LeMaster – vocals on tracks 1, 2, 3, 4, 6, 8, guitar on tracks 4, 10, bass guitar on track 10
Matt Maginn – bass guitar on tracks 1, 2, 3, 4, 5, 6, 7, 8
Carla Azar – drums, percussion on tracks 2, 6, 8
Clark Baechle – drums on tracks 1, 3, 4, 5, 7
Shane Agsperen – drums on track 10, additional drums on track 3, additional percussion on track 2
Laura Burhenn – vocals on tracks 4, 7, 8
Denny Brewer – shamanic vocals

Charts

References

External links
 www.conoroberst.com
 NPR First Listen: Bright Eyes — The People's Key

2011 albums
Bright Eyes (band) albums
Saddle Creek Records albums
Albums produced by Mike Mogis